Fiy is a rural locality (a selo) in Akhtynsky District, Republic of Dagestan, Russia. The population was 1,710 as of 2010.

Geography 
Fiy is located 31 km southwest of Akhty (the district's administrative centre) by road, on the Fiya River. Gdym is the nearest rural locality.

References 

Rural localities in Akhtynsky District